Fucosterol is a sterol isolated from algae such as Ecklonia cava or Ecklonia stolonifera.

References

External links 
 

Ecklonia
Sterols